Tre'vell Anderson is an American journalist, critic, editor, and podcaster. They previously worked for the publications Los Angeles Times, Xtra, and Out. They co-host the podcasts What A Day and FANTI. Anderson received two GLAAD Media Award nominations for their writing.

Career 
Anderson began their journalism career as a film critic for the Los Angeles Times, where they worked for four years, leaving in 2018. They later worked for Out Magazine as the director of culture and entertainment. Anderson began writing for the queer outlet Xtra Magazine in January 2020 in the role of editor-at-large. 

Their writing centers issues of race, gender, the LGBTQ community, and pop culture. They have advocated for more racial diversity in LGBTQ media productions. They have provided commentary to the New York Times, NBC News, BuzzFeed News, NPR, The Daily Beast, and KJZZ. In 2021 Anderson received GLAAD Media Award nominations for two articles, "Why Billy Porter is a National Treasure" and "It’s Time for a New Tipping Point for Transgender Folks in Hollywood".

In September 2021 Anderson joined the Hollywood Foreign Press Association's Credentials Committee, the body that selects new members.

They hosted the EW podcast Untold Stories: Beyond the Binary beginning in June 2020, which focused on nonbinary identity in culture and media. Since 2020 they have co-hosted the culture and politics podcast FANTI with Jarrett Hill, produced by Maximum Fun. As of 2022 Anderson is a co-host for the Crooked Media news podcast What A Day.

Anderson's debut book, We See Each Other: A Black, Trans Journey Through TV and Film, will be released in May 2023 under Andscape Books.

Personal life 
Anderson was born and raised in Charleston, South Carolina. They received their bachelor's degree in socoiology from Morehouse College and a master's degree in journalism from Stanford University. 

They began to identify as gender nonconforming as an undergraduate. Anderson is nonbinary and use they/them pronouns.

Accolades 
 2020 − The Root 100 Honoree
 2020 − NABJ Region IV Director
 2021 − Ken Popert Media Fellow, Pink Triangle Press

Awards and nominations

GLAAD Media Awards 
 2021 − Nominee, Outstanding Print Article (for "It’s Time for a New Tipping Point for Transgender Folks in Hollywood")
 2021 − Nominee, Outstanding Print Article (for "Why Billy Porter is a National Treasure")

References

External links 
 Official website

Year of birth missing (living people)
Living people
21st-century African-American writers
African-American journalists
American critics
American podcasters
LGBT African Americans
Non-binary journalists
American non-binary writers
Morehouse College alumni
Stanford University alumni
Writers from Charleston, South Carolina
American LGBT journalists